Schoenoplectiella is a genus of sedges. Its native range is world-wide. The genus was first described in 2003 by Kaare Arnstein Lye, and the type species is Schoenoplectiella articulata. There are no synonyms.

Species list
According to Plants of the World Online, there are 52 accepted species.
Schoenoplectiella aberrans 
Schoenoplectiella articulata 
Schoenoplectiella blakei 
Schoenoplectiella bucharica 
Schoenoplectiella chen-moui 
Schoenoplectiella chuana 
Schoenoplectiella clemensiae 
Schoenoplectiella dissachantha 
Schoenoplectiella erecta 
Schoenoplectiella fohaiensis 
Schoenoplectiella fuscorubens 
Schoenoplectiella gemmifera 
Schoenoplectiella hallii 
Schoenoplectiella heterophylla 
Schoenoplectiella hondoensis 
Schoenoplectiella hooperae 
Schoenoplectiella hotarui 
Schoenoplectiella humillima 
Schoenoplectiella × igaensis 
Schoenoplectiella × intermedia 
Schoenoplectiella jingmenensis 
Schoenoplectiella juncea 
Schoenoplectiella × juncohotarui 
Schoenoplectiella juncoides 
Schoenoplectiella kandawlayensis 
Schoenoplectiella komarovii 
Schoenoplectiella laevis 
Schoenoplectiella lateriflora 
choenoplectiella leucantha 
Schoenoplectiella lineolata 
Schoenoplectiella × magrathii 
Schoenoplectiella melanosperma 
Schoenoplectiella microglumis 
Schoenoplectiella mucronata 
Schoenoplectiella multiseta 
Schoenoplectiella naikiana 
Schoenoplectiella × oguraensis 
Schoenoplectiella oligoseta 
Schoenoplectiella orthorhizomata 
Schoenoplectiella × osoreyamensis 
Schoenoplectiella oxyjulos 
Schoenoplectiella patentiglumis 
Schoenoplectiella perrieri 
Schoenoplectiella praelongata 
Schoenoplectiella proxima 
Schoenoplectiella purshiana 
Schoenoplectiella rechingeri 
Schoenoplectiella reducta 
Schoenoplectiella roylei 
Schoenoplectiella saximontana 
Schoenoplectiella schoofii 
Schoenoplectiella senegalensis 
Schoenoplectiella smithii 
Schoenoplectiella subbisetosa 
Schoenoplectiella supina 
Schoenoplectiella trapezoidea 
Schoenoplectiella × uzenensis 
Schoenoplectiella vohemarensis 
Schoenoplectiella wallichii 
Schoenoplectiella × yashiroi

References

External links

Schoenoplectiella occurrence data from GBIF

 
Cyperaceae genera